Australia have competed in every edition of the Rugby League World Cup. They have won the competition 11 out of 15 times and have finished as runners-up on three other occasions. At every tournament, they have automatically qualified.

Tournament results

Tournaments

1954

1957

1960

1968

1970

1972

1975

1977

1985–1988

1989–1992

1995

2000

2008

2013

2017

2021

References

External links 

Australia national rugby league team
Rugby League World Cup